In Greek mythology, the name Halaesus or Halesus (Latin name: Alesi) may refer to:

Halesus, the Emathian Lapith who attended the wedding of Pirithous and Hippodamia. He was killed and stripped of his armor by the Centaur Latreus during the battle between the Lapiths and the centaurs.
Halesus, a companion of Agamemnon during the Trojan War; some state that he was an illegitimate son of Agamemnon. After the war, having escaped the massacre organized by Clytaemnestra and Aegisthus of Agamemnon and his retinue, he travelled to Italy and founded the city of Falerii (now Civita Castellana), which received its name after him. He joined Turnus in the war against Aeneas, "not because he liked Turnus but because of the hate caused by his ancient hostility (towards Aeneas)", as Servius remarks. He was killed by Pallas while defending Imaon, a fellow warrior.

Notes

References 

 Maurus Servius Honoratus, In Vergilii carmina comentarii. Servii Grammatici qui feruntur in Vergilii carmina commentarii; recensuerunt Georgius Thilo et Hermannus Hagen. Georgius Thilo. Leipzig. B. G. Teubner. 1881. Online version at the Perseus Digital Library.
 Publius Ovidius Naso, Amores edited by Christopher Marlowe, Ed. Online version at the Perseus Digital Library.
 Publius Ovidius Naso, Amores, Epistulae, Medicamina faciei femineae, Ars amatoria, Remedia amoris. R. Ehwald. edidit ex Rudolphi Merkelii recognitione. Leipzig. B. G. Teubner. 1907. Latin text available at the Perseus Digital Library.
 Publius Ovidius Naso, Fasti translated by James G. Frazer. Online version at the Topos Text Project.
 Publius Ovidius Naso, Fasti. Sir James George Frazer. London; Cambridge, MA. William Heinemann Ltd.; Harvard University Press. 1933. Latin text available at the Perseus Digital Library.
 Publius Ovidius Naso, Metamorphoses translated by Brookes More (1859-1942). Boston, Cornhill Publishing Co. 1922. Online version at the Perseus Digital Library.
 Publius Ovidius Naso, Metamorphoses. Hugo Magnus. Gotha (Germany). Friedr. Andr. Perthes. 1892. Latin text available at the Perseus Digital Library.
 Publius Vergilius Maro, Aeneid. Theodore C. Williams. trans. Boston. Houghton Mifflin Co. 1910. Online version at the Perseus Digital Library.
 Publius Vergilius Maro, Bucolics, Aeneid, and Georgics. J. B. Greenough. Boston. Ginn & Co. 1900. Latin text available at the Perseus Digital Library.

Achaeans (Homer)
Characters in the Aeneid
Lapiths in Greek mythology